Orašac is a village  in the municipality of Aranđelovac in Central Serbia. According to the 2002 census, the village has a population of 1462 people. It is best known as the starting point of the First Serbian Uprising in 1804, as the site of the Orašac Assembly.

American anthropologists Joel and Barbara Halpern wrote an extensive body of papers and books about Orašac. The books include A Serbian Village (1958) and A Serbian Village in Historical Perspective (1986).

References

External links

 Selected Works of Joel M. Halpern: Chapter 1, Selected Papers on a Serbian Village: Social Structure as Reflected by History, Demography and Oral Tradition
 Selected Works of Joel M. Halpern: Comparative Dynamics of a Traditional Serbian Village: Oraciac 1863 to 1975

Šumadija
Populated places in Šumadija District
First Serbian Uprising
Open-air museums in Serbia